St. Colman's College may refer to:

 St Colman's College, Claremorris, a boys secondary school in County Mayo, Ireland
 St Colman's College, Fermoy, a boys secondary school in County Cork, Ireland
 St Colman's College, Newry, a boys secondary school in County Down, Northern Ireland